Sunflower moths may be three species of moths, whose larvae are pests of sunflowers:

Homoeosoma electellum, American sunflower moth
Homoeosoma nebulella, Eurasian sunflower moth
Heterocampa cubana, sunflower moth found in Cuba and the US state of Florida

Animal common name disambiguation pages